Louis Robert Golic (June 19, 1931 – June 28, 2013) was a Canadian football player who played for the Montreal Alouettes, Hamilton Tiger-Cats and Saskatchewan Roughriders. He won the Grey Cup with Hamilton in 1957. He played college football at Indiana University Bloomington. He was the father of American football players Mike Golic and Bob Golic as well as the grandfather of Mike Golic Jr.

References

1931 births
2013 deaths
American football offensive linemen
American players of Canadian football
Hamilton Tiger-Cats players
Indiana Hoosiers football players
Montreal Alouettes players
Saskatchewan Roughriders players
People from Willowick, Ohio
Players of American football from Ohio